The 1982 British motorcycle Grand Prix was the ninth round of the 1982 Grand Prix motorcycle racing season. It took place on the weekend of 30–1 August 1982 at the Silverstone Circuit.

Classification

500 cc

References

British motorcycle Grand Prix
British
Motorcycle Grand Prix